HMS Worcester was a 60-gun fourth rate ship of the line of the Royal Navy, built by Joseph Allin the younger at Portsmouth Dockyard to the 1733 proposals of the 1719 Establishment, and launched on 20 December 1735.

She took part in the battle of Portobello under Captain Perry Mayne in 1739.

Worcester was broken up in 1765.

Notes

References

Lavery, Brian (2003) The Ship of the Line - Volume 1: The development of the battlefleet 1650-1850. Conway Maritime Press. .

External links
 

Ships of the line of the Royal Navy
1730s ships